Gravois Creek is a stream in south central Morgan County, Missouri. It is a tributary of the Osage River within the Lake of the Ozarks.

The stream was named for the large quantity of gravel in its streambed from the French "gravois" rubbish or gravel.

References

Rivers of Morgan County, Missouri
Rivers of Missouri